Romano-Greek (also referred to as Hellenoromani) is a nearly extinct mixed language (referred to as Para-Romani in Romani linguistics), spoken by the Romani people in Greece that arose from language contact between Romani speaking people and the Greek language. The language is suspected to be a secret language spoken in Thessaly and Central Greece Administrative Unit. Typologically the language is structured on Greek with heavy lexical borrowing from Romani. Dortika is a secret language spoken mainly in Athens by traveling builders from Eurytania Prefecture. In both cases, the languages are most likely not native to their speakers.

References 

Endangered languages of Europe
Greek language
Romani in Greece
Para-Romani
Languages of Greece